Polyakovsky is a rural locality (a settlement) and the administrative center of Polyakovsky Selsoviet of Zeysky District, Amur Oblast, Russia. The population was 278 as of 2018. There are 9 streets.

Geography 
Polyakovsky is located on the left bank of the Zeya River, 130 km south of Zeya (the district's administrative centre) by road. Yubileyny is the nearest rural locality.

References 

Rural localities in Zeysky District